Pedro Vázquez Viñas (born 19 February 1989 in Vigo, Galicia) is a Spanish footballer who plays for Icelandic second-tier club UMF Afturelding as a right winger.

References

External links

1989 births
Living people
Footballers from Vigo
Association football wingers
Spanish footballers
Celta de Vigo B players
Villarreal CF B players
Orihuela CF players
Coruxo FC players
UD Melilla footballers
Pontevedra CF footballers
Afturelding men's football players
Segunda División players
Segunda División B players
1. deild karla players
Spanish expatriate footballers
Expatriate footballers in Iceland
Spanish expatriate sportspeople in Iceland